Maria Ceiça (born Maria da Conceição Justino de Paula in Rio de Janeiro, October 18, 1965) is a Brazilian actress, singer and performer, who has a significant career in theater, movies and television.

Biography 
Trained at the Martins Pena Theater School in Rio de Janeiro, she began her professional career in 1989 at the TV Globo, with the telenovela Pacto de Sangue. Since then, she has appeared in various telenovelas for TV Globo and Rede Record, interpreting highly popular characters with Brazilian and Portuguese public audiences, such as Tuquinha Batista in the telenovela Felicidade or Márcia in Por Amor.

Winner of the Andorinha Trophy, Special Jury Prize at the Film Festival of Portuguese Language Countries, in 2006 and honored by a Special Tribute at the African Film Festival in New York City in 2005, she has starred in many films, including several important Brazilian and international productions, such as Filhas do Vento (Brazil), winner of 6 Kikitos (Awards) at the Gramado Festival (the most important Brazilian cinema festival), Cruz e Sousa, o poeta do Desterro ( Brazil ), and Se eu fosse você (Brazil). She played the lead female role in the internationally acclaimed movies, Testamento (Cape Verde, 1997), winner of Best Film Kikito at the Gramado Festival and several other international awards in 1997, and The Hero (Angola, 2004), winner of the Sundance Film Festival Grand Jury Prize in 2004 and other awards.

In theater, she has performed in more than 15 pieces on all stages of Brazil, including major hits such as Boeing - Boeing, A Lua que me Instrua, and The Blacks from Jean Genet.  She has also performed as a singer in two shows, based on Brazilian Popular Music (MPB).
Since 1997, she has also performed for TV Escola, an educational channel aimed at teachers and students from Brazilian public schools.
In 2007, she served as Superintendent (Coordinator) of Racial Equality at the Secretariat of Social Assistance and Human Rights of the State of Rio de Janeiro.
Currently, Maria Ceiça runs her own production company, the Luminis Produtora Produções Artísticas.

Filmography 
2012 - The Great Kilapy - Mãe de Joãozinho
2006 - Se Eu Fosse Você - Márcia
2005 - Daughters of the Wind (Filhas do Vento)  - Selminha
2004 - The Hero - Maria Bárbara
2003 - Rua Alguem 5555: My Father - First Newsman
2003 - Aleijadinho - Paixão, Glória e Suplício - Helena
1999 - Orfeu - Carmen
1998 - Cruz e Sousa, o Poeta do Desterro - Gavíria
1997 - Napomuceno's Will  - Graça
1995 - Carlota Joaquina, Princess of Brazil - Gertrudes

TV works 
2015 - Os Dez Mandamentos - Nayla
2010 - A História de Ester - Quinlá
2008 - Os Mutantes: Caminhos do Coração - Rosana Magalhães
2007 - Caminhos do Coração - Rosana Magalhães
2005 - Prova de Amor - Marília Padilha
2000 - Uga-Uga - Rosa
1999 - Chiquinha Gonzaga - Divina
1997 - Por Amor - Márcia
1995 - Tocaia Grande - Rufina
1993 - Fera Ferida - Engrácia dos Anjos
1991 - Felicidade - Tuquinha Batista
1990 - Mãe de Santo (miniseries)
1989 - Pacto de Sangue - Joana

References

External links 
 

Actresses from Rio de Janeiro (city)
Brazilian film actresses
Brazilian stage actresses
Brazilian television actresses
1965 births
Living people